Paratoxotus is a genus of beetles in the family Cerambycidae, containing the following species:

 Paratoxotus argodi Fairmaire, 1901
 Paratoxotus farinosus Fairmaire, 1902
 Paratoxotus inexpunctatus Fairmaire, 1903

References

Dorcasominae